Elizabeth Alley (January 31, 1955 – February 8, 2013) was an American actress. She played Melinda Fall on NBC's soap opera Sunset Beach. She also had a short guest role on NBC's Days of Our Lives, and appeared on many other shows as a guest star.

In February 2013, Alley checked into UCLA in order to have surgery to correct a brain aneurysm. She died there on February 8, 2013, at age 58.

References

External links
 
 

1955 births
2013 deaths
American soap opera actresses
Deaths from intracranial aneurysm
21st-century American women